Tofino/Long Beach Airport  is a non-towered airport that is located within the Pacific Rim National Park Reserve.

It is both a general aviation and commercial airport, used by both private aircraft and seasonal commercial services.

Coastal fog is a common morning phenomenon in the summer, complicating access by air until the weather clears. Several instrument flight rules (IFR) approaches are available including Global Positioning System (GPS) and non-directional beacon (NDB) types. This airport is equipped for night time operations.

History

RCAF Station Tofino was constructed in 1941 to defend Canada's Pacific coast from Axis attack during the Second World War. In 1945 the site was decommissioned, to be reopened again as a radar station in the Pinetree Line in 1955 to defend against Soviet attack. The radar station was closed in 1958, at which time it became a civilian airfield. It is currently owned and operated by Alberni-Clayoquot Regional District.

Airlines and destinations

Facilities

A small terminal building was completed in 2010. It contains airline kiosks, a waiting area, washrooms, and food vending machines. 

Additional Services include:
 Budget Rent a Car - kiosk inside terminal building
 Aviation fuel (cardlock) - Avgas and Jet A
 Parking - 80 spaces, free

Additional structures include:
 Small maintenance hangar
 Service vehicle shed (2 bays)
 Salt dome
 Metal storage sheds (2)
 Long wood shed

Environment Canada has a weather station on site, operated by a private contractor.

Transportation

No transit links exist. Taxis and ridesharing are available upon request. 

The airport is adjacent to Pacific Rim Highway which was completed in 1959, connecting Tofino and Ucluelet with Port Alberni. The airport is accessed via a short drive down Airport Road, passing some abandoned Royal Canadian Air Force structures.

See also
 List of airports on Vancouver Island

References

External links

Certified airports in British Columbia
Clayoquot Sound region
1941 establishments in British Columbia